Clarence Linberg Miller (30 March 1934 – 16 August 2018), better known as Count Prince Miller, was a Jamaican-born British actor and musician.

Biography
Miller began as a musician, recording a number of reggae songs. His best known song is "Mule Train Parts One & Two", which was a hit on Trojan Records in 1971, before being re-recorded with Sly and Robbie in the early 1980s. Adding elements of music hall performance to his reggae style, Miller drew comparison with Judge Dread for his somewhat bawdy music. He also regularly appeared with Jimmy James. Known as something of a showman Miller was picked to compere the 1969 Wembley Reggae Festival, the first major reggae music event in Britain.

Acting
As an actor Miller's credits include the role of Vince in the Channel 4 sitcom Desmond's, initially an occasional role until the last series, when he became a regular. The character was a member of the fictional group the Georgetown Dreamers, in which Miller was joined by fellow musicians Ram John Holder and Sol Raye, as well as the show's star Norman Beaton. Miller's role continued in the spin-off series, Porkpie.

Earlier, in 1962, Miller appeared as a nightclub dancer in the 1962 James Bond film, Dr. No.

Miller went on to make an appearance in the 2003 film What a Girl Wants, while he secured Best Male Actor Award at the 2006 Black Film Makers' International Awards Ceremony for his role in Winnie and the Duppy Bat. Additionally, Miller played a small role in the 2017 film, Kingsman: The Golden Circle, as 'Elderly Patient 2'.

Miller also appeared in plays, two of which were written by J. D. Douglas (Black Heroes and JA Story). He was praised for his portrayal of Marcus Garvey in the former.

Honours
In 2007, Miller was made a Commander of the Order of Distinction for his contributions to the music industry in Jamaica.

References

External links
 
 Programme for 1969 Wembley Reggae Festival including profile of Miller

1934 births
2018 deaths
Jamaican male television actors
Jamaican expatriates in the United Kingdom
Jamaican reggae musicians
Commanders of the Order of Distinction
People from Saint Mary Parish, Jamaica
20th-century Jamaican male actors
21st-century Jamaican male actors